|}

|}
Richard Hughes (born 11 January 1973) is a retired Irish jockey and current racehorse trainer who is based at Lambourn in Berkshire, England. Born in Dublin, he is the son of successful National Hunt trainer, Dessie Hughes. Hughes became British flat racing Champion Jockey in 2012 and retained that title in 2013, when he rode more than 200 winners in the season, and again in 2014.

Riding career
Hughes started pony racing aged seven, having his first win aboard Chestnut Lady in a six furlong race at Wexford. His first ride in the senior ranks was in a six furlong maiden at Naas on 19 March 1988, on a debutant called Scath Na Greine. He finished tenth.

From 2001-07, Hughes was the retained jockey for owner Prince Khalid Abdullah.  For many years up to his retirement on 1 August 2015, his main provider of rides were trainers Richard Hannon Sr. (his own father-in-law) and Richard Hannon Jr. (his brother-in-law), who took over the Hannon stables from his father at the end of 2013.  

Hughes is 5'10" in height, very tall for a flat jockey, similar to his contemporary jump jockey Tony McCoy; both men had to maintain their weight significantly below natural levels, even for a jockey. His larger natural size meant he could not ride horses carrying light weights, reducing his winning opportunities. Hughes was respected for his riding style of 'nursing' horses along, getting horses to respond and run into the race without appearing to physically ride them hard.

In October 2011, Hughes received a five day ban for hitting Swift Blade six times in the final furlong and a few days later got a ten day ban for hitting More Than Words too many times with the whip inside the final furlong in a race at Kempton. The ban was the first of its kind to be implemented after a change in the rules regarding horse welfare. On 13 October 2011, it was announced that Hughes was giving up his racing licence and quitting the sport out of protest at the ban.

Hughes did not follow up on this threat and on 15 October 2012 he equaled Frankie Dettori's record of winning seven races in a single meeting by winning seven out of eight races at Windsor Racecourse.

The following month, he claimed his first British flat racing Champion Jockey title with 172 winners over the season.

In May 2013, after a long wait, he won his first British Classic on Sky Lantern in the 1,000 Guineas. He then won his second a month later on Talent in the Oaks. On 21 June 2013, he won the Coronation Stakes at Royal Ascot on 1000 Guineas winner Sky Lantern.

At the end of the 2013 British flat racing Hughes was crowned Champion Jockey for the second consecutive season. His total of 208 winners made him the first jockey to ride more than 200 winners in a British flat season since Kieren Fallon in 2003. He retained the title again in 2014, before retiring mid-way through the following season and taking up training.

Personal life
Hughes is married to wife Lizzie and the couple have two sons and a daughter. Outside of racing he enjoys playing a lot of golf.

British career flat wins

 1994  19
 1995  68
 1996  62
 1997  33
 1998  55
 1999  95
 2000  102
 2001  91
 2002  126
 2003  121
 2004  73
 2005  124
 2006  113
 2007  139
 2008  127
 2009  144
 2010  192
 2011  130
 2012  177
 2013  208
 2014  166
 2015  63

Major wins
 Great Britain
1,000 Guineas – (1) – Sky Lantern (2013)
 Cheveley Park Stakes – (2) – Indian Ink (2006), Tiggy Wiggy (2014)
 Coronation Stakes – (2) – Indian Ink (2007), Sky Lantern (2013)
 Epsom Oaks – (1) – Talent (2013)
 Falmouth Stakes – (1) – Music Show (2010)
 Haydock Sprint Cup – (1) – Tante Rose (2004)
 July Cup – (1) – Oasis Dream (2003)
 King's Stand Stakes – (2) – Piccolo (1995), Sole Power (2014)
 Lockinge Stakes – (2) – Paco Boy (2010), Canford Cliffs (2011)
 Nassau Stakes – (1) – The Fugue (2012)
 Nunthorpe Stakes – (2) – Oasis Dream (2003), Sole Power (2014)
 Queen Anne Stakes – (3) – Paco Boy (2009), Canford Cliffs (2011), Toronado (2014)
 Queen Elizabeth II Stakes – (1) – Olympic Glory (2013)
 St James's Palace Stakes – (1) – Canford Cliffs (2010)
 Sussex Stakes – (2) – Canford Cliffs (2010), Toronado (2013)

 France
 Critérium de Saint-Cloud – (1) – Passage of Time (2006)
 Grand Prix de Saint-Cloud – (1) – Youmzain (2008)
 Poule d'Essai des Poulains – (1) – American Post (2004)
 Poule d'Essai des Pouliches – (1) – Zenda (2002)
 Prix du Cadran – (1) – Invermark (1998)
 Prix de Diane – (1) – Nebraska Tornado (2003)
 Prix d'Ispahan – (1) – Observatory (2001)
 Prix Jean-Luc Lagardère – (2) – American Post (2003), Olympic Glory (2012)
 Prix Jean Prat – (1) – Dick Turpin (2010)
 Prix du Moulin de Longchamp – (1) – Nebraska Tornado (2003)

 India
 Bangalore Derby – (1) – Moonlight Romance (2010 – Summer season)
 Indian 1,000 Guineas – (1) – Jacqueline (2009)
 Indian 2,000 Guineas – (4) – Smart Chieftain (1999), Autonomy (2008), Jacqueline (2009), Ocean And Beyond (2010), Pronto Pronto (2011)
 Indian Derby – (2) – Smart Chieftain (2000), Jacqueline (2010)
 Indian Oaks – (2) –  Jacqueline (2010), Moonlight Romance (2011)

 Ireland
 Goffs Million – (2) – Soul City (2008), Lucky General (2009)
 Irish Champion Hurdle – (1) – Cockney Lad (1997)
 Irish 2,000 Guineas – (1) – Canford Cliffs (2010)
 Matron Stakes – (1) – Tadwiga (1998)
 Moyglare Stud Stakes – (1) – Sky Lantern (2012)
 Paddy Power Future Champions Novice Hurdle - (1)  His Song (1997)

 Italy
 Derby Italiano – (1) – Bahamian Knight (1996)
 Gran Premio d'Italia – (1) – Posidonas (1995)
 Premio Vittorio di Capua – (1) – Mistle Cat (1996)

 United Arab Emirates
 Al Quoz Sprint – (1) - Sole Power (2015)

 United States
 Breeders' Cup Juvenile Fillies Turf – (1) – Chriselliam (2013)

See also
List of jockeys

References

External links
 Profile – Richard Hughes BBC Sport, 23 April 2004
 Hughes breaks with Abdullah to ride as freelance The Independent, 22 October 2007
 Richard Hughes – Collected Articles The Guardian
 Richard Hughes – Statistics Racing Post
 People in Racing: Richard Hughes (flat) British Horseracing Authority
 Jockey Richard Hughes on his battle with alcoholism BBC Sport, 22 June 2012
 An Irishman Abroad – Richard Hughes: Episode 27 Hughes talks to podcaster and childhood friend Jarlath Regan; SoundCloud, March 2014

1973 births
Irish jockeys
Living people
Lester Award winners
British Champion flat jockeys
Irish racehorse trainers